Michael East  may refer to:

 Michael East (composer) (c. 1580–1648), English organist and composer
 Michael East (athlete) (born 1978), British middle-distance runner